The 1963 Tony Bettenhausen 200 was the seventh round of the 1963 USAC Championship Car season, held on August 18, 1963, at the  Milwaukee Mile, in West Allis, Wisconsin.

The race was the first American Championship Car race won by a rear-engined car.  Jim Clark and Team Lotus had finished second at the 1963 Indianapolis 500 after a controversy surrounding the lack of a black flag for winner Parnelli Jones, whose car was leaking oil.  Colin Chapman and Team Lotus decided to return to Champ Car competition at Milwaukee and Trenton later in the year.  The rear-engined Lotuses dominated practice and qualifying, breaking the track record by over a second.  In the race, Clark led all 200 laps and lapped the entire field, save for second place A. J. Foyt.  Clark's teammate Dan Gurney finished third, battling a misfire.

Although a rear-engined car would not win the Indianapolis 500 until 1965, the win signaled a shift in Champ Car design.  The last win for a front-engined roadster on a paved track was the opening round of the 1965 season at Phoenix, barely a year and a half after Clark's Milwaukee victory.

Qualifying
Clark, Gurney, Foyt, and Jones broke the previous qualifying record set in 1961 by Don Branson at 34.09 sec (105.62 mph / 169.94 km/h).

Race result

Standings after the race 
National Championship standings

 Note: Only the top five positions are included.

References

Tony Bettenhausen
Milwaukee Indy 225